InterOil Exploration and Production is a Norwegian petroleum company with operations in Peru, Colombia, Ghana and Angola.  The company is traded on the Oslo Stock Exchange.

References

External links
List of petroleum companies

Oil companies of Norway
Companies established in 2005
Companies listed on the Oslo Stock Exchange
Non-renewable resource companies established in 2005